The 1999 Teen Choice Awards ceremony was held on August 1, 1999, at the Barker Hangar, Santa Monica, California. The event did not have a designated host, however, Britney Spears introduced the show with Christina Aguilera, Blink-182, NSYNC and Gloria Estefan, and Britney Spears as performers.

Performers
 Christina Aguilera – "Genie in a Bottle"
 Blink-182 – "What's My Age Again?"
 NSYNC and Gloria Estefan – "Music of My Heart"
 Britney Spears – "Sometimes" and "(You Drive Me) Crazy"

Presenters

98 Degrees
Christina Aguilera
Tatyana Ali
Lisa Andersen
Brandi Chastain
Holly Marie Combs
Jesse Eisenberg
Daisy Fuentes
Jennie Garth
Alyson Hannigan
Melissa Joan Hart
Anne Hathaway
Jordan Knight
Mila Kunis
Ashton Kutcher
Ali Landry
LFO
Tara Lipinski
Jennifer Lopez
Kellie Martin
Master P
Matthew McConaughey
Monica
Meredith Monroe
Eric Christian Olsen
Luke Perry
Bijou Phillips
Dr. Drew Pinsky
Antonio Sabàto Jr.
Kelly Slater
Britney Spears
Steps
Verne Troyer
Tyrese
Wilmer Valderrama
Marlon Wayans
Shawn Wayans
Ian Ziering

Winners and nominees
Winners are listed first and highlighted in bold text.

Movies

Television

Music

Miscellaneous

References

1999
1999 awards
1999 in American music
1999 in California
20th century in Los Angeles